The following is a list of events and releases that happened in 2022 in African music.

Events
April 3 – Angélique Kidjo wins the Grammy Award for Best Global Music Album for the second time, with her 2021 album Mother Nature. 
May 17 – Interviewed on Asaase Radio, Stonebwoy responds to criticism of himself and other African artists such as Black Sherif for attending a party hosted by Kendrick Lamar in Ghana.
September 4 – The 15th edition of Nigerian music awards The Headies is held in Atlanta, Georgia, United States.
September 22 – Morocco's Tanjazz Festival is held after a two-year gap caused by the COVID-19 pandemic.<ref.</ref>

Albums released in 2022

Musical films
Neptune Frost, starring Elvis Ngabo, Cheryl Isheja and Kaya Free, with music by Saul Williams

Deaths
February 15 – Vivi l'internationale, 75–76, Beninese singer
February 23 – Riky Rick, 34, South African rapper (suicide)
March 28 (death announced on this date) – Mira Calix, 51/52, South African electronic musician and producer
April 8 – Osinachi Nwachukwu, 42, Nigerian gospel singer (cause undisclosed)
April 14 – Orlando Julius, 79, Nigerian Afrobeat saxophonist, singer, bandleader, and songwriter
May 15 – Deborah Fraser, 55, South African gospel singer (stroke)
June 11 – Amb Osayomore Joseph, 69, Nigerian highlife pioneer
June 12 – Dawit Nega, 34, Ethiopian singer
June 21 – Pierre Narcisse, 45, Cameroonian singer
August 15 – Tokollo Tshabalala, 45, South African Kwaito musician
August 18 – Hadrawi, 79, Somali poet and songwriter
September 12 – Dennis East, 73, South African singer, songwriter and producer
November 6 – Ali Birra, 72, Ethiopian singer
November 25 – Sammie Okposo, 51, Nigerian gospel singer
December 5 – Hamsou Garba, 63, Nigerien singer
December 10 
 Tshala Muana, 64, Congolese singer, "Queen of Mutuashi"
 Aziouz Raïs, 68, Algerian chaabi singer.
December 12 – Ekambi Brillant, 74, Cameroonian makossa singer

See also 
 2022 in music

References 

Africa
African music
African music